Xylophanes columbiana is a moth of the  family Sphingidae. It is known from Colombia.

The length of the forewings is about 32 mm. It is similar to Xylophanes elara, the thorax and abdomen for instance are identical in colour and pattern. Difference is that the third of the oblique postmedian lines lies so close to the heavy fourth line that it is virtually indistinguishable. The dark subbasal area along the inner margin of the forewing underside is less extensive. Of the five postmedian lines present in Xylophanes elara, line one is heavier, line two is absent, line three is prominent from the costa almost to the inner margin, line four is absent and line five is more wavy.

Adults are probably on wing year-round.

The larvae probably feed on Rubiaceae and Malvaceae species.

References

columbiana
Moths described in 1935
Endemic fauna of Colombia
Moths of South America